Medina  is a village in the Towns of Shelby and Ridgeway in Orleans County, New York, United States. It is located approximately 10 miles south of Lake Ontario. The population was 6,065 at the 2010 census, making it the county's most populous municipality. The village was named by its surveyor, Ebenezer Mix. It is part of the Rochester Metropolitan Statistical Area. The Medina zip code, 14103, encompasses the village of Medina and the surrounding towns of Ridgeway and Shelby.  The United States Census Bureau estimates the 2017 population of this area to be 17,234.

The village developed after construction of the Erie Canal, which bends as it passes through the village, creating a basin that served as a stopover point. This became the center of businesses that served trade and passenger traffic on canal boats. In addition, mills were constructed on Oak Orchard Creek to take advantage of its water power. The fertile lands around the village yielded fruit which was exported to major markets of New York City and west via the canal. At the start of the 20th century, Medina was a thriving industrial town.

Medina is located about an hour drive from two major cities, Rochester, to the east, and Buffalo, to the west. It is also about 30 minutes from two small cities, Batavia and Lockport.

History
Joseph Ellicott, the agent of the Holland Land Company, once owned land that encompassed part of the village, purchased from the Holland Land Company. With the opening of the Erie Canal through Medina, the village enjoyed more trade and business associated with freight and passengers on canal boats.

The Village of Medina was incorporated March 3, 1832, creating an entity contained within the two towns of Ridgeway and Shelby. The charter of incorporation called for five Trustees to be elected as village officials. That same year the first printing press was set up in the village and the first newspaper published, The Medina Herald.

In 1852, the railroad arrived in Medina and passenger service quickly became popular.

Early Industry 
Medina's first known industry was an ashery. The area was mostly covered in trees and brush when Ebenezer Mix was assigned to survey the area. Clearing the area would have been necessary for the village to be laid out and the Erie Canal built. An ashery would convert hardwood ash into lye or other usable products. Most of these industries would rely on the Erie Canal for their transportation needs.

Mills 
Medina had a variety of mills over the years. Grain and flour mills were very important to the area and built as early as 1830. Two stave mills existed in the 1870's, producing wood strips for the production of barrels. A Cloth mill also existed for a time though exactly when is not known. Saw mills were used for creating rough lumber and finished boards for other local industry.

Barrel Manufacturing 
The popularity of flour production resulted in a large need for barrels to transport the flour down the Erie Canal.

Foundries 
The Bignall Foundry began selling iron pumps, sinks, and more in 1861. After several fires, the company was part of a consolidation into the Central Foundry Company along with two other local foundries, A.L. Swett Company and Beach & Co in 1899. The Central Foundry focused on soil pipe manufacturing. A.L Swett Iron Works opened in 1871 to manufacture hardware specialties and continued operations in Medina through the 1920's. Beach & Co manufactured plumbing supplies starting in the 1880's.

Furniture Manufacturing 
The Maher Brothers were the first large scale furniture maker in Medina, opening in 1882. The family continued to run the business until 1928. S.A. Cook opened their furniture business around 1882, the Morris chair being among their most popular products. In 1911, Mr. Cook built a large block on Main St which still bears his name today. Another large furniture company of note was the Empire Couch Company. They moved to Medina in 1902. They successfully operated through the widening of the canal in 1913 but could not stay in business during through the Depression, declaring bankruptcy in 1935.

Medina Sandstone 
Medina is known for its Medina Sandstone, a stone used widely in buildings across the region. Some local examples include the "million dollar staircase" at the New York State Capitol in Albany, the Richardson Olmsted Complex in Buffalo, and in buildings at the University of Rochester and Cornell University. Sandstone varies in color from light grey to a deep reddish brown.

The first commercial sandstone quarry was opened in 1837 by John Ryan. At their peak, sandstone quarries were one of the largest employers in the county with upwards of 2,000 employees. With the discovery of cheaper alternatives, Medina Sandstone's popularity began to decline around World War 1.

Pearl Street Armory 
In 1901, a State Armory was built of Medina Sandstone and located on the corner of Pearl St and Prospect Ave. Company F moved into the facility in 1902 with units serving in WWI and WWII. The Armory was officially closed by NYS in 1977.  Company F records can found at Lee-Whedon Memorial Library. A bronze statue and memorial was erected in front of the building in honor of Company F in 2019. The building now houses the YMCA.

POW Camp 
Medina's Heinz factory housed a POW camp from 1943 to 1946. Seventy-one Italian soldiers arrived at the Heinz barracks in September 1943. They were allowed to work at the Heinz factory, local farms, or other local factories. In May 1944, the Italian soldiers were moved to a new location and replaced with 116 German soldiers.

During their tenure in Medina, the German prisoners went on strike to protest the smoking regulations at the Heinz factory. The soldiers wanted to smoke in the factory building and on the loading platforms. After having all of their possessions removed and not being allowed to sleep in the barracks, all of the soldiers voluntarily returned to work the following day.

In 1946, the Heinz camp was closed and all remaining prisoners were moved to local military installations in preparation for their return to Germany. During its use, the Heinz barracks housed up to 300 soldiers and 50 military police.

Recent history 
In 2015, village residents voted to keep Medina an incorporated village, despite having the highest effective property tax rate in the Finger Lakes region according to a 2016 Empire Center report.

The Main Street Historic District, Medina Armory, and United States Post Office are listed on the National Register of Historic Places.  The Payjack Chevrolet Building was added in 2012 and Boxwood Cemetery in 2015.

Geography
Medina is located at  (43.219808, -78.390101).

Medina lies at the junction of east–west highway NYS Route 31 and north–south highway NYS Route 63. In addition, Medina marks the location where NYS Route 31E and NYS Route 31A split off from NY-31.

Demographics

As of the census of 2000, there were 6,415 people, 2,567 households, and 1,576 families residing in the village. The population density was 1,962.1 people per square mile (757.4/km2). There were 2,796 housing units at an average density of 855.2 per square mile (330.1/km2). The racial makeup of the village was 87.89% White, 7.56% African American, 0.59% Native American, 0.56% Asian, 0.03% Pacific Islander, 1.62% from other races, and 1.75% from two or more races. Hispanic or Latino of any race were 3.83% of the population.

There were 2,567 households, out of which 31.8% had children under the age of 18 living with them, 42.3% were married couples living together, 15.0% had a female householder with no husband present, and 38.6% were non-families. 32.3% of all households were made up of individuals, and 16.3% had someone living alone who was 65 years of age or older. The average household size was 2.41 and the average family size was 3.07.

In the village, the population was spread out, with 26.9% under the age of 18, 7.9% from 18 to 24, 27.2% from 25 to 44, 20.0% from 45 to 64, and 18.0% who were 65 years of age or older. The median age was 37 years. For every 100 females, there were 83.7 males. For every 100 females age 18 and over, there were 80.3 males.

The median income for a household in the village was $30,300, and the median income for a family was $37,857. Males had a median income of $31,857 versus $21,633 for females. The per capita income for the village was $16,138. About 13.0% of families and 16.4% of the population were below the poverty line, including 24.7% of those under age 18 and 4.6% of those age 65 or over.

Religion 
Over the years Medina has been home to many different populations. St. John's Episcopal Church was the first church in Medina, consecrated in 1828. In the following decade, the First United Presbyterian, First Baptist, United Methodist, and St. Mary's Roman Catholic Churches were built. German immigrants started arriving in the 1880s and 1890s and built Trinity Evangelical Lutheran and St. Peter Evangelical Lutheran.

At the turn of the century, the Polish community had grown so large that they built Sacred Heart of Jesus Christ Church in 1910. In 1930, the African American community built Glad Tidings Missionary Baptist Church. Grace Baptist Church, an offshoot from another local Baptist church in Shelby, was built next.

More recently the Church of Jesus Christ of Latter-Day Saints, Fountain of Love, the Islamic Center, Calvary Tabernacle Assembly of God, Grace Covenant, Holiness Pentecostal, and Morning Star of God in Christ have opened. The Church of God Pentecostal purchased the former United Methodist Church in 2016. In 2017, the Akron Free Methodist Church leased the former Sacred Heart Catholic Church and began having services.  Of the 15+ churches and religious institutions that have operated in Medina, 11 are still in the village.

Medina is featured in Ripley's Believe It or Not for St. John's Episcopal Church, known as the "Church in the Middle of the Road".

Government

Local 
Medina is governed by a mayor and four trustees. Each position has a two-year term.

County 
See: Orleans County, New York

State 

 The 62nd Senate District represented by Senator Rob Ortt
 The 139th Assembly District represented by Assemblyman Steve Hawley

Federal 

 The 27th Congressional District, represented by Congressman Chris Jacobs
 US Senators representing New York State are Charles Schumer and Kirsten Gillibrand

Courts 

 The 8th Judicial Division of the New York Supreme Court
 The 4th Department of the New York Supreme Court, Appellate Division

Economy 
Medina is home to several international, national, and local businesses. Medina is also becoming a tourist attraction because of its historic downtown and location on the Niagara Wine Trail.

Business 
Here is a listing of some of the larger businesses in the area.

 Baxter International- Baxter has one of their many facilities located in Medina. They manufacture a multitude of products for the healthcare industry, including IV infusion pumps and pharmacy automation.
 Velocitii, who specialize in business process outsourcing, opened in 2014. Their 20,000 square foot customer engagement center employs agents able to assist companies both domestic and international with sales, back-office, and customer support. Currently,  Velocitii employs over 50 full-time employees across various industries including insurance, healthcare and medical, as well as software and technology.
 Brunner International- Brunner International is a family owned business located in Medina since 1992. A second facility is located in Niagara Falls, NY. They produce parts for commercial vehicles, buses, and trailers.
 Hinspergers Poly Industries- Hinspergers produces protective polyethylene covers.
 Pride Pak Canada- Pride Pak Canada opened a facility in Medina in 2016. They package salads and fresh-cut vegetables.
 Takeform- Takeform, a signage company, is headquartered in Medina. They have won numerous awards in their field and own multiple patents.
 Western New York Energy- In May 2006, New York Governor George Pataki announced the construction in Medina of the first ethanol plant in the Northeastern United States. The plant began receiving deliveries of corn in October 2007 and was expected to start production in November 2007. Partial production began shortly thereafter, and full production was announced by GreenShift Corporation on February 25, 2008. Since that time, the Western New York Energy, LLC plant has been in production, processing significant portions of the local corn crop. In 2022, they expanded the facility to start production of industrial, pharmaceutical, and beverage grade alcohol.

Tourism 
Medina is starting to grow as a popular tourist spot, appearing in several blogs and papers. The events, restaurants, and atmosphere of this small village have wide-ranging appeal.

Arts and entertainment 
There are several cultural and educational opportunities in Medina. If you're more adventurous get locked in a room at Into the Enigma; you only have 1 hour to solve the puzzles and escape.  You can also visit the Medina Railroad Museum, one of the largest railroad and toy train museums in the state of New York. Ripley's Believe It or Not notes "the Culvert", as the only place where the Erie Canal passes over an operating road.

Behind the historic downtown buildings, new modern art and murals can be seen. The mural project was an initiative of the non-profit Form Foundation. The first to be painted has been dubbed the 'Canalligator' and was painted in July 2020. The first mural was followed by geometric characters in September, a traveler with his dog and cat in October, and a mural of local pollinator flowers in November. All four murals can be seen behind buildings on the NW side of Main St.

The Orleans Renaissance Group, Inc.– or ORG is a 501(c)(3) volunteer organization dedicated to supporting and promoting the arts, culture and preservation in the greater Medina, New York area. Incorporated in 1999, the group has been at the forefront of promoting the arts, cultural activities and preservation. Among their initiatives past and present are hosting world-class concert events including the Buffalo Philharmonic Orchestra, world-renown Anonymous 4, Irish tenor Ronan Tynan; sponsoring the Canal Village Farmers’ Market; hosting WNY’s premier gourmet locally-sourced Farm-to Table Dinner; partnering with local initiatives to develop our Erie Canal Waterfront, developing and establishing a historic sign trail, preserving local history through partnerships with local organizations; initiating the restoration of Bent’s Opera House in Historic Downtown Medina; co-sponsoring Blue Thursdays summer concert series in State Street Park, and many others. Their website can be found at medinaalive.com.

Bars and restaurants 
Medina has a variety of bars and restaurants to enjoy.  Zambistro is a locally owned fine dining restaurant and caterer which opened in 2006. Harvest at Bent's is the newest fine dining option in Medina, where you can watch the chefs prepare your meal through the open kitchen. Fitzgibbons Public House is a casual pub with Irish food.  Mariachi de Oro serves authentic Mexican food and has been well reviewed in WNY. The Shirt Factory is a cocktail bar.  The Walsh Hotel reopened in 2022, with a bar and private event space. Medina also offers a variety of pizza shops, diners, and fast food options.

Medina has one stop on the Niagara Wine Trail Leonard Oakes Estate Winery. Leonard Oakes Winery has won multiple awards for their wines, including best ice wine in New York.

Where to Stay 
Medina has several options when you come to visit. The Bunkhaus Hostel offers 3 private bedrooms with a shared kitchen and living room. The Hart House Hotel is a European style boutique hotel with seven themed rooms, located in the historic Newell Shirt Factory building. Bent's Opera House has 10 themed rooms available to rent. Comfort Inn and Suites opened a 58 room hotel in 2022.

Historic Downtown 
Medina's downtown area has been designated a historic district and listed on the National Register of Historic Places. Bent's Opera House is included in this district, a historic venue for touring performers.

Education 
Medina has two K-12 schools, the Medina Central School District and the Orleans County Christian School. The Medina Central School District is composed of Oak Orchard Primary, Clifford Wise Intermediate and the Medina High School. All three buildings are located on the same campus. The Orleans County Christian School is a non-denominational, multi-church sponsored school.

A branch campus of Genesee Community College, opened in 2007, is also located in Medina.

Medina has one public library which serves the community, Lee-Whedon Memorial Library.

Culture and recreation

Park lands 
The village has seven different parks; all of which are open to the public from dawn until dusk. The majority of parks have swings, slides, and picnic tables; Rotary Park located on Main Street and the Medina Canal Basin park do not.

 Gulf Street Park
 Gwinn Street Park
 John E Butts Memorial Park - Also has an outdoor skating rink in the winter, a skateboard park, and baseball diamonds.
 Medina Canal Basin Park - Offers docking facilities, electrical hook up, pump-out station, and potable water.
 Pine Street Park - Playground with splashpad
 Rotary Park - All Season House, used by Santa in November and December.
 State Street Park - Gazebo

Annual events 

 Ale in Autumn - Enjoy walking around downtown Medina while sampling a beers from around the world.
 Olde Tyme Christmas and Parade of Lights - Annual event held the Saturday after Thanksgiving. Enjoy shopping and activities during the day and fireworks and the Parade of Lights in the evening.
 Wine about Winter - Walk around Medina, sampling local and state wines.
Sweets in Summer - Sweets tastings throughout the Historic Downtown area.
Faery Festival - Activities, dancing, and a parade geared towards children.

Media 
Medina had several newspapers throughout the years, starting with The Medina Herald. The Medina Tribune, The Medina Register, and The Medina Daily Journal followed. The Register and Journal merged becoming The Medina Daily Journal and Register. The shortened Medina Journal-Register closed its doors in May 2014.

Additional facts 
One of the oldest homes in Medina stood at 224 Eagle Street, a block from the Erie Canal, on the north side of town. This home was built in the early 1820s and was purchased by the Burnam family in the 1830s. It stayed in the possession of family members until around 1984. The house was torn down in 2012.

The Carl Company was a department store founded as a dry good store in Medina by Charles W. Carl, Sr.

Notable people
John J. Bagley, former Governor of Michigan, was born and raised in Medina
Julie Berry (author), children's author
Kate Messner, children's author
Deanna Cameron, YA author 
Silas M. Burroughs, was a former US Congressman who lived in Medina. 
Silas M. Burroughs, son of the former Congressman, was born in Medina and became a notable pharmacist.
Frances Folsom Cleveland Preston, former First Lady, attended high school in Medina before marrying Grover Cleveland.
Carl Fischer, former MLB player
John E. Butts, Second Lieutenant, U.S. Army, Co. E, 60th Infantry, 9th Infantry Division, was awarded the Medal of Honor in WWII
John Ford, New York State Senator
George Kennan, author, lecturer and traveler
Craig Wilson, USA Today columnist

References

External links

 Village of Medina, official website
 Medina information
 
 Sandstone Society, official website
 Niagara Wine Trail, official website

Villages in New York (state)
Rochester metropolitan area, New York
Erie Canal
Populated places established in 1817
Villages in Orleans County, New York
1817 establishments in New York (state)